Francis James McLynn FRHistS FRGS (born 29 August 1941), known as Frank McLynn, is a British author, biographer, historian and journalist. He is noted for critically acclaimed biographies of Napoleon Bonaparte, Robert Louis Stevenson, Carl Jung, Richard Francis Burton and Henry Morton Stanley.

Early life and education
McLynn was educated at Wadham College, Oxford and the University of London. He was Alistair Horne Research Fellow at St Antony's College, Oxford (1987–88) and was visiting professor in the Department of Literature at the University of Strathclyde (1996–2001) and  professorial fellow at Goldsmiths College London (2000–2002) before becoming a full-time writer.

Bibliography

Books
France and the Jacobite Rising of 1745 (1981), Edinburgh University Press  
The Jacobite Army in England, 1745–46 (1983), John Donald Publishers Ltd
The Jacobites (1985), Law Book Co of Australasia  
Invasion: From the Armada to Hitler (1987), Routledge  
Charles Edward Stuart: A Tragedy in Many Acts (1988) Routledge; Reissued (2020) by Sharpe Books .  
Crime and Punishment in Eighteenth Century England (1989), Routledge  
Stanley: The Making of an African Explorer, 1841–1877 (1990), Scarborough House Publishers   
From the Sierras to the Pampas: Richard Burton's Travels in the Americas, 1860–69 (1991), Trafalgar Square  
Stanley: Sorcerer's Apprentice (1992), Oxford University Press  
Snow upon the Desert: The Life of Sir Richard Burton (1993), John Murray Publishers Ltd  
Hearts of Darkness: The European Exploration of Africa (1993), Carroll & Graf Pub   
Famous Letters: Messages & Thoughts That Shaped Our World (1993), Reader's Digest Association  
Fitzroy MacLean (1993), John Murray Publishers Ltd  
Robert Louis Stevenson: A Biography (1994), Random House  
Famous Trials: Cases That Made History (1995), Reader's Digest  
Napoleon: A Biography (1997), Arcade Publishing  
Carl Gustav Jung: A Biography (1997), Thomas Dunne Books  
1066: The Year of the Three Battles (1998), Jonathan Cape, Reissued by Pimlico,   
Villa and Zapata: A History of the Mexican Revolution (2000), Basic Books  
Wagons West: The Epic Story of America's Overland Trails (2002), Grove Press  
1759: The Year Britain Became Master of the World (2005), Atlantic Monthly Press,   
Lionheart and Lackland: King Richard, King John and the Wars of Conquest (2006), Jonathan Cape 
Published in the US as Richard and John: Kings at War (2007), Da Capo Press   
Marcus Aurelius: Warrior, Philosopher, Emperor (2009), Bodley Head,     
Heroes and Villains: Inside the Minds of the Greatest Warriors in History (2009), Pegasus
The Burma Campaign: Disaster Into Triumph 1942–45 (2010), Bodley Head, Issued by Yale University Press in 2011, 
Captain Cook: Master of the Seas (2011), Yale University Press, 
The Road Not Taken: How Britain Narrowly Missed a Revolution, 1381–1926 (2012), Random House
Genghis Khan: The Man Who Conquered the World (2015), Bodley Head,

As editor
Of No Country: An Anthology of the Works of Sir Richard Burton (1990), London: Scribners

Criticism and reviews

Captain Cook : master of the seas (2011)

Awards and accolades
 Cheltenham Prize for Literature (1985; for The Jacobite Army in England)
Shortlisted, McVitie's Prize for Scottish Writer of the Year (1989, for Charles Edward Stuart)

See also
 Napoleon legacy and memory

References

1941 births
Alumni of Wadham College, Oxford
British biographers
British military historians
Living people
Academics of the University of Strathclyde
Fellows of St Antony's College, Oxford
British male journalists
Fellows of the Royal Historical Society
Fellows of the Royal Geographical Society
Alumni of the University of London
Male biographers